Engis is a municipality of Wallonia located in the province of Liège, Belgium. 

On 1 January 2006 Engis had a total population of 5,686. The total area is 27.74 km² which gives a population density of 205 inhabitants per km².

The municipality consists of the following districts: Clermont-sous-Huy, Engis and Hermalle-sous-Huy.

In 1829, in this village, Philippe-Charles Schmerling discovered the first Neanderthal ever, Engis 2, the damaged skull of a young child. This was before the 1856 discovery of the Neanderthal type specimen in the Neander Valley. Its importance was not recognised until 1936.

Pollution fatalities

In late 1930 and early 1931, several thousand cases of acute pulmonary attacks occurred in the Meuse valley, centered on Engis, and 60 people died.  A commission of inquiry set up by the Belgian government concluded that the cause was poisonous waste gases, primarily sulfur dioxide, emitted by the many factories in the valley and the furnaces used by the population, in conjunction with unusual climatic conditions coupled with the unique  topographic characteristics of the area. Others have claimed that the deaths were the result acute fluorine intoxication.

Notable residents
 Johann Hermann Janssens (1783–1853), theologian, died in Engis

See also
 List of protected heritage sites in Engis

References

External links
 

Municipalities of Liège Province
Neanderthal sites